Kettle Run High School can refer to:

Kettle Run High School (Nokesville, Virginia), in Fauquier County
Patriot  High School (Prince William County, Virginia) (originally named Kettle Run)